Nikša Bratoš (born 17 August 1959 in Travnik, PR Bosnia and Herzegovina, FPR Yugoslavia) is a Bosnian musician. He is known for having played in bands Valentino and Crvena jabuka. He has worked on songs for a variety of Croatian pop artists.

Biography
Bratoš was born in 1959, and graduated from the University of Electronics in Sarajevo in 1985. He played guitar and sang backup vocals in Valentino before transitioning into Crvena jabuka.

Bratoš first worked with Crvena jabuka as a producer. He was recruited to produce 1988's Sanjati, and then every subsequent album. Bratoš was later recruited as a member of the band. He is known for having played many different instruments. Generally he played rhythm guitar, but periodically harmonica, saxophone, mandolin, melodika, clarinet, and woodwinds and sometimes keyboards, synthesizers and singing backup vocals. Bratoš was able to add horn arrangements as well as other string instruments which the band became known for in the 1990s.

In 1990 Bratoš moved to Zagreb where he continued to be involved in music as a guitarist, producer, and keyboard player. In 1994 he became an official member of Crvena jabuka and since then has performed at all of their concerts and their albums. He was also responsible for the production and programming on each album.

He arranged the song "Metak sa posvetom" for Lepa Brena's 2011 album Začarani krug.

Personal life 
Bratoš has two sons, Goran and Marko. Son Marko works as a presenter at the radio station Narodni radio in Zagreb. In late 2017, Bratoš filed lawsuit against Želimir Babogredac. At one of the trials, Crvena jabuka frontman Dražen Žerić, was also present. The epilogue took place in 2018.

References

External links 

1959 births
Living people
People from Travnik
Croats of Bosnia and Herzegovina
Croatian pop musicians
Musicians from Zagreb